Liebing is a German surname that may refer to:
 Chris Liebing (born 1968), German techno producer and DJ
 Franziska Liebing (1899–1989), Swedish actress
 Otto Liebing (1891–1967), German rower who competed in the 1912 Summer Olympics

See also
Liebing, a town in Burgenland, Austria